Tima, also known as Domorik or Lomorik, is a Katla language spoken by the Tima people of Sudan.

References

External links
Tima language documentation project

Katloid languages
Severely endangered languages